Ranoidea exophthalmia is a species of frog in the subfamily Pelodryadinae. It is commonly known as the big-eyed tree frog, but that name may also refer to the African species, Leptopelis vermiculatus.
It is endemic to Papua New Guinea.
Its natural habitats are subtropical or tropical moist lowland forests, subtropical or tropical moist montane forests, and rivers.

References
 

Ranoidea (genus)
Amphibians of Papua New Guinea
Amphibians described in 1986
Taxonomy articles created by Polbot
Taxobox binomials not recognized by IUCN